The last four stages of the 2010 Copa Santander Libertadores are the knockout stages: the Round of 16, the Quarterfinals, the Semifinals, and the Finals.

Format
The remaining stages of the tournament constitute a single-elimination tournament. In each stage, the teams will play an opponent in a two-legged tie on a home-away basis. Each team will earn three points for a win, one point for a draw, and zero points for a loss. The team with the most points at the end of each tie will advance. Fourteen teams will advance from the second stage; the eight group winners, the six group runners-up teams with the best records. The remaining two entries will go to Mexican clubs Guadalajara and San Luis.

Tie-breaking
The following criteria will be used for breaking ties on points:
Goal difference
Away goals
Penalty shootout

Seeding
The 16 qualified teams were seeded according to their results in the Second Stage. The top teams from each group were seeded 1–8, with the team with the most points as seed 1 and the team with the least as seed 8. The second-best teams from each group were seeded 9–16, with the team with the most points as seed 9 and the team with the least as seed 16. Guadalajara and San Luis were given the 13 and 14 seed, respectively, which they had earned in the 2009 Copa Libertadores.

Bracket

Round of 16

Match A

Corinthians 3–3 Flamengo on points. Flamengo advanced on away goals.

Match B

São Paulo 2–2 Universitario on points. São Paulo advanced on penalties.

Match C

Estudiantes advanced on points 6–0.

Match D

Vélez Sársfield 3–3 Guadalajara on points. Guadalajara advanced on goal difference.

Match E

Libertad advanced on points 4–1.

Match F

Internacional 3–3 Banfield on points. Internacional advanced on away goals.

Match G

Cruzeiro advanced on points 6–0.

Match H

Universidad de Chile advanced on points 4–1.

Quarterfinals

Match S1

Universidad de Chile 3–3 Flamengo on points. Universidad de Chile advanced on away goals.

Match S2

São Paulo advanced on points 6–0.

Match S3

Estudiantes 3–3 Internacional on points. Internacional advanced on away goals.

Match S4

Libertad 3–3 Guadalajara on points. Guadalajara advanced on goal difference.

Semifinals

Match F1

Guadalajara advanced 4–1 on points.

Match F2

São Paulo 3–3 Internacional on points. Internacional advanced on away goals.

Finals

Internacional won the Copa Libertadores on points 6-0.

References

External links
CONMEBOL's official website  
Official rules 

3